The Argentina national rugby league team (formerly nicknamed the Penguins but now the Jabalis) represent Argentina in the sport of rugby league football.

History 
Argentina first played rugby league in 2005 when the Australian Police Rugby League Association organised a tour to Buenos Aires. The Australian Police team played two games against Argentina. The first was a 40-4 win for the Australian Police, with a crowd of around 150 attending. The second game was a 60–6 win for the Australian Police with a crowd attendance of around 300.

The sport then remained dormant in the country for over 10 years before being revived in 2016 amidst a number of other South and Central American nations taking up the sport. Argentina saw its first domestic activity for a decade in November 2016 when it hosted the Primer Torneo Sudamericano de Rugby League, a slightly modified 9-a-side tournament in Miramar involving the national teams of Argentina and Chile, as well as a number of select sides from around the region which were bolstered by the Latin Heat organization. The final of the event was between the Argentinian and Chilean national teams, with Argentina winning 16-0.

In 2017, with great effort from the players and coaching staff, Argentina traveled to Chile by bus, to be in the inaugural Latinoamericano Championship. This was the first time that a Latin American championship was played with 13 players a side, three referees and full RLIF tournament rules. This event gave Argentina their first chance to earn World Ranking points and debut in the International Rankings. Argentina's first match of the tournament was a 36-6 win over Colombia. This win earned a spot in the Final against Chile with Argentina losing 32-12 to a team sporting a number of heritage players from Australia. The Argentinian team for the tournament was wholly made up of players from development and social leagues and no heritage players.

2018 saw Argentina playing in the Confederação Brasileira de Rugby League Festival in Sao Paulo, beating Colombia 28-16 before losing to Brazil in the final by 22-20 despite leading 14-20 at one point.

Nowadays, the national team struggles to survive trying to add players, open some local competition and arrange some international friendlies with the typical economic issues of an amateur sport in the country.

Current squad 
Squad selected for 2018 South American Rugby League Cup;
Juan Ignacio Canepa
Marcelo Villalba
Emiliano Rodriguez
Ares Martinez
Ariel Cosso
Facundo Lizarzuay
Lucas Escobar
Gaston Barrera
Dario Moyano
Ulises Silva
Nahuel Lajmanovich
Leandro Donato
Sergio Espinola
Dylan Moreira
Juan Carlos Blumetti
Ernesto Di Nucci
Leandro Kwiczor
Brian Avejera

See also

Rugby league in Argentina

References

External links
 

Rugby League
National rugby league teams
Rugby league in Argentina
South American national rugby league teams